The 1918 Colorado gubernatorial election was held on November 5, 1918. Republican nominee Oliver Henry Shoup defeated Democratic nominee Thomas J. Tynan with 51.15% of the vote.

Primary elections
Primary elections were held on September 10, 1918.

Democratic primary

Candidates
Thomas J. Tynan, Colorado State Penitentiary Warden

Results

Republican primary

Candidates
Oliver Henry Shoup, businessman

Results

General election

Candidates
Major party candidates
Oliver Henry Shoup, Republican
Thomas J. Tynan, Democratic

Other candidates
Mary L. Geffs, Socialist

Results

References

1918
Colorado
Gubernatorial